David Cosman Nettheim (10 July 1925 – 11 March 2008) was an Australian actor and stage writer, he acted on stage and film, but was best known for his roles in numerous television series.

Early life
Born in Sydney, New South Wales, and brought up in Cremorne Point the eldest son of actor (Leslie) Roy Nettheim (who hosted a classical music programme on radio 2GB and its Macquarie Radio Network) and the actress Mary Hosking, he was introduced to the theatre when his parents joined Doris Fitton's Independent Theatre.

Career
He was educated at Sydney Grammar School and joined 2GB as an office boy in 1941. He took on occasional writing and announcing roles and was involved in production of John Dease's Quiz Kids.

He helped Sir Charles Mackerras (an old schoolfriend) prepare classical music programmes for radio. He adapted Xavier Herbert's Capricornia as a radio serial.

He was involved with the Metropolitan Theatre, Mercury Theatre and Phillip Street Theatre, where he both wrote for and acted in their famous revues.

He worked with Michael Bentine and John Bluthal in the Goon Show-like radio programme Three's a Crowd for radio 2UE, which ran for 34 weekly half-hour episodes. He next worked in Britain with Peter Sellers and Michael Bentine in the 1957 television comedy skit show Yes, It's the Cathode-Ray Tube Show. The following year he moved to Britain, and for 20 years he was seldom out of work but maintained ties with Australia in regular hookups with John West for his radio programme The Showman. In 1971 he appeared in the acclaimed BBC drama Elizabeth R as forger Thomas Phelippes.

In 1977 he settled in the Sydney suburb of Glebe. He appeared in stage and television productions, and took on the positions of federal treasurer for Actors Equity. He was involved in the doomed campaign to save the Regent Theatre in Sydney from demolition and helped manage the Actors' Benevolent Fund.

Throughout the 1980s and 1990s Nettheim appeared in guest roles in numerous Australian TV mini series and serials, including Prisoner, Sons and Daughters, and A Country Practice.

Death
He died 11 March 2008 in Sydney aged 82. He never married and was survived by two brothers and two sisters.

Filmography

External links

References 

20th-century Australian male actors
Male actors from Sydney
Australian male radio actors
2008 deaths
1925 births
Australian male film actors